Colleoli is a village in Tuscany, central Italy, administratively a frazione of the comune of Palaia, province of Pisa.

Colleoli is about 40 km from Pisa and 2 km from Palaia.

References

Bibliography 
 

Frazioni of the Province of Pisa